Diana McLean is an Australian stage and television actress and voice over artist., best known for her roles as Sister Vivienne Jeffreys in TV soap opera The Young Doctors in 549 episodes from 1978 and 1981.

Acting career 
In 1969, McLean appeared in an episode of the comedy series Good Morning Mr Doubleday.

In the early 1970s, she appeared in an episode of the classic Australian police series Division 4, and an episode of Boney. She also appeared as "Dorothy Dunlop" in the Australian series Number 96.
 
In the mid 1970s, she appeared as "Helen McGuire" in nine episodes of the series Ben Hall, and then as "Sister Vivienne Jeffries" from 1978 until 1982 in the series The Young Doctors.

In 1999 she played the part of "Bess O'Brien" in Neighbours.

In 1982, she appeared in the film, Early Frost.

Her work in the theatre has included The Cold Child in 2006 and Love & Money in 2007. In 2014, she reprised her role of "Vera" 4000 Miles, for which she was nominated for the "Best Actress in a Leading Role in an Independent Production"  Sydney Theatre Award in 2013. She toured Australia in 2017 and 2018, playing "Florence Foster Jenkins" in the stage comedy Glorious.

She also appeared in the play Air in 2018.

Other work
In 2010 she attended a book launch by screen writer, director and producer Alan Coleman. His autobiography, One Door Shuts was launched at the Hotel Bondi, Sydney on 10 January 2010.

In 2014, McLean explained her voice techniques in a video called The other side of the glass.

In 2018, she appeared on the Australian programme The Daily Edition to discuss her career.

Filmography

References

External links
 
 Showcast profile page

1941 births
Living people
Australian television actresses
Australian stage actresses